Giannis Theonas (29 October 1940 – 12 September 2021) was a Greek politician who served as a Member of the European Parliament for the Communist Party of Greece. He was born in Naxos.

References

1940 births
2021 deaths
People from Naxos
Greek politicians
MEPs for Greece 1994–1999
MEPs for Greece 1999–2004
Communist Party of Greece MEPs
Syriza politicians